Shirdi Airport  is a domestic airport serving the city of Shirdi, Maharashtra, India. It is the fourth busiest airport in the state after Mumbai, Pune, and Nagpur airports. The airport, spread over 400 hectares, is owned by the Maharashtra Airport Development Company (MADC) and was inaugurated by President, Ram Nath Kovind on 1 October 2017. Communication Navigation Surveillance (CNS) and Air Traffic Control (ATC) at the airport is operated by the Airports Authority of India (AAI).

History 
The Ahmednagar district administration officially acquired land for the greenfield airport project on 22 December 2009.
The Rs. 340 crore airport project was part of the State Government's effort to promote religious tourism at Shirdi, known for the temple of Sai Baba, among the most revered spiritual gurus in India. Around 80,000 devotees who visit the temple town daily used to access Shirdi via road, Sainagar Shirdi Railway Station, Kopargaon Railway Station and the Aurangabad and Pune airports located 125 km and 186 km respectively from Shirdi.
The single runway was initially intended to be 60 metres wide and 2,000 metres long and the airport was expected to start operations in December 2011. However, the MADC decided to extend the length of the runway to 3,200 metres to enable operations of larger aircraft and consequently the project missed its deadline. Runway length now stands at 2,500 metres. 
Plans for a terminal building costing around Rs. 40 crore were abandoned due to shortage of funds and a smaller terminal costing 3-4 crores was built instead.
The work was expected to be completed before the forthcoming centenary celebrations of Sai Baba's Samadhi that will draw thousands of devotees to the pilgrim town from various parts of the country as well as abroad.
MADC completed the construction work by February 2016 and applied to the Directorate General of Civil Aviation (DGCA) for an aerodrome licence to commence operation of non-scheduled flights.
The DGCA issued the licence on 21 September 2017 and stated that the runway of 2,500 meters is capable of handling Code 3C type aircraft such as the Airbus A320  and Boeing 737. An Alliance Air ATR-72 operated a test run from Mumbai Airport, landing at Shirdi on 26 September 2017.

Airlines and destinations

Statistics

Infrastructure
The airport is equipped with a runway  in length.
A DVOR system was installed at the airport in September 2019 to enable aircraft to land at the airport in low visibility.

References

External links 
 MADC Shirdi Website
Shirdi Airport Website
Shirdi airport to be ready in a year
 Shirdi airport work in full swing: Official

Airports in Maharashtra
Transport in Shirdi
Airports established in 2017
2017 establishments in Maharashtra